Belle Grove may refer to:

Places

United States

Virginia 
 Belle Grove, Pittsylvania County, Virginia, a 1790s Federal-style home owned by the Whitmell P. Tunstall family
 Belle Grove (Delaplane, Virginia), a 19th-century Federal-style house and farm
 Belle Grove Plantation (Middletown, Virginia), an 18th-century Federal-style plantation house
 Cedar Creek and Belle Grove National Historical Park, encompassing the above since 2002
 Belle Grove Plantation (Port Conway, Virginia), birthplace of President James Madison

Louisiana 
 Belle Grove Plantation (Iberville Parish, Louisiana), 19th-century plantation house
 Belle Grove (Terrebonne Parish, Louisiana), 19th-century plantation house

Other places 
Belle Grove Historic District, Fort Smith, Arkansas
Belle Grove Wildlife Management Area

Other uses 
 Battle of Belle Grove (1864), American Civil War battle in the Virginia counties of Frederick, Shenandoah, and Warren
 USS Belle Grove (LSD-2), a 1943 Ashland-class dock landing ship